The men's team sabre was one of seven fencing events on the fencing at the 1936 Summer Olympics programme. It was the seventh appearance of the event. The competition was held from 12 August 1936 to 13 August 1936. 107 fencers from 21 nations competed. Each team could have a maximum of six fencers, with four participating in any given match.

The competition format continued the pool play round-robin from prior years. Each of the four fencers from one team would face each of the four from the other, for a total of 16 bouts per match. The team that won more bouts won the match, with competition potentially stopping when one team reached 9 points out of the possible 16 (this did not always occur and matches sometimes continued). If the bouts were 8–8, touches received was used to determine the winning team. Pool matches unnecessary to the result were not played.</ref>

Rosters

Austria
 Josef Losert
 Hugo Weczerek
 Karl Sudrich
 Hubert Loisel
 Karl Hanisch
 Karl Kaschka

Belgium
 Eugène Laermans
 Georges Heywaert
 Robert Van Den Neucker
 Henri Brasseur
 Hubert Van Nerom

Canada
 Ernest Dalton
 Charles Otis
 George Tully
 Don Collinge

Chile
 Efrain Díaz
 Tomas Barraza
 Ricardo Romero
 Julio Moreno
 Tomás Goyoaga

Czechoslovakia
 Josef Jungmann
 Jozef Benedik
 Hervarth Frass von Friedenfeldt
 Bohuslav Kirchmann
 Josef Hildebrand

Denmark
 Erik Hammer Sørensen
 Preben Christiansen
 Aage Leidersdorff
 Svend Jacobsen

France
 Marcel Faure
 Maurice Gramain
 Edward Gardère
 Jean Piot
 Roger Barisien
 André Gardère

Germany
 Richard Wahl
 Julius Eisenecker
 Erwin Casmir
 August Heim
 Hans Esser
 Hans-Georg Jörger

Great Britain
 Oliver Trinder
 Arthur Pilbrow
 Guy Harry
 Robin Brook
 Roger Tredgold

Greece
 Nikolaos Manolesos
 Nikolaos Paparrodou
 Konstantinos Botasis
 Menelaos Psarrakis

Hungary
 Aladár Gerevich
 Tibor Berczelly
 Pál Kovács
 Endre Kabos
 László Rajcsányi
 Imre Rajczy

Italy
 Giulio Gaudini
 Gustavo Marzi
 Aldo Masciotta
 Vincenzo Pinton
 Aldo Montano
 Athos Tanzini

Netherlands
 Ate Faber
 Antonius Montfoort
 Frans Mosman
 Pieter van Wieringen
 Jacob Schriever

Poland
 Antoni Sobik
 Władysław Segda
 Władysław Dobrowolski
 Adam Papée
 Marian Suski
 Teodor Zaczyk

Romania
 Nicolae Marinescu
 Gheorghe Man
 Kamilló Szathmáry
 Denis Dolecsko

Sweden
 Bengt Ljungquist
 Knut Nordholm
 Hubert de Bèsche
 Ivar Tingdahl
 Carl Johan Wachtmeister

Switzerland
 Charles Glasstetter
 Alphonse Ruckstuhl
 Walter Widemann
 Adolf Stocker

Turkey
 Ilhami Çene
 Enver Balkan
 Cihat Teğin
 Abdul Halim Tokmakçioğlu
 Orhan Adaş

United States
 Peter Bruder
 Miguel de Capriles
 Bela De Nagy
 John Huffman
 Samuel Stewart
 Norman Cohn-Armitage

Uruguay
 Carmelo Bentancur
 José Julián de la Fuente
 Hildemaro Lista
 París Rodríguez
 Jorge Rolando

Yugoslavia
 Krešo Tretinjak
 Milivoj Radović
 Eugen Jakobčič
 Edo Marion
 Pavao Pintarić

Results

Round 1

The top two teams in each pool advanced to round 2.

Pool 1

Germany and Uruguay each defeated Romania, so Romania was eliminated and Germany and Uruguay did not face each other.

Pool 2

Brazil withdrew before competing, leaving Austria and Sweden to advance by default.

Pool 3

Hungary defeated Denmark 16–0. Belgium then defeated Denmark, with the match stopped at 9–1 when Denmark's loss (and elimination) was assured.

Pool 4

Czechoslovakia defeated Greece 11–5. Poland then defeated Greece, with the match stopped at 9–3 when Greece's loss (and elimination) was assured.

Pool 5

The Netherlands defeated Chile 13–3. Great Britain then defeated Chile, 10–6, resulting in Chile's elimination.

Pool 6

France defeated Canada 13–3. Italy then defeated Canada, 15–1, resulting in Canada's elimination.

Pool 7

In the first set of matches, the United States defeated Switzerland while Turkey defeated Yugoslavia. The second pair of matches saw the United States win again, this time over Turkey, while Switzerland defeated Yugoslavia. This resulted in the United States being guaranteed advancement while Yugoslavia was eliminated (and thus the two did not face each other). Turkey and Switzerland, each 1–1, faced each other for the final advancement spot, with Turkey winning on touches received 58–70 after the individual bouts were tied 8–8.

Round 2

The top two teams in each pool advanced to the semifinals.

Pool 1

Austria and Hungary each defeated Uruguay, so Uruguay was eliminated and Austria and Hungary did not face each other.

Pool 2

Belgium defeated Germany, 9–7, while Great Britain and France each took 8 individual bouts and France won on touches received, 56–65. In the second set of matches, Germany defeated France and Great Britain defeated Belgium, each by 11–5. This left all four teams at 1–1, so the last matches were each winner-advances. Germany prevailed over Great Britain, 11–5. France had its second match of the round go to 8–8, winning again by touches received, 60–63.

Pool 3

The Netherlands defeated Czechoslovakia 14–2. Italy then defeated Czechoslovakia, with the match stopped at 9–5 when Czechoslovakia's loss (and elimination) was assured.

Pool 4

Poland defeated Sweden, 15–1. The United States was supposed to face Turkey, who the Americans had defeated in the first round, but this match did not occur due to Turkey's non-competition. This was not a withdrawal from competition, as Turkey later faced Poland; nor does it seem to be a case of using the prior result again, as the official report points specifically to Turkey and states the team "did not compete." Sports-reference gives the result as a win for the United States and loss for Turkey, with 0–0 individual bouts. The second set of matches in the round featured the United States against Sweden (stopped at a 9–1 United States win) and the aforementioned Poland–Turkey match (stopped at a 9–2 Poland win). Counting the U.S.–Turkey non-match as a United States win left Poland and the United States at 2–0 and advancing to the semifinals while Sweden and Turkey were 0–2 and eliminated; the third set of matches did not take place.

Semifinals

The top two teams in each pool advanced to the final.

Pool 1

In the first set of matches, Poland defeated France (10–6) while Italy defeated Austria (9–7). In the second, the winners each won again to end the competition: Poland prevailed over Austria by touches received 56–60 (8–8 bouts) and Italy beat France with the match stopped at 9–2.

Pool 2

Hungary defeated Germany, 15–1, while the United States beat the Netherlands, 9–7. In the second set of matches, Hungary again won 15–1, this time over the Netherlands, while Germany defeated the United States 9–7. In the final set of matches, Hungary beat the United States 14–2 and Germany defeated the Netherlands 9–3 with both of the winners earning advancement.

Final

In the first set of matches, Hungary defeated Germany (13–3) while Italy defeated Poland (10–6). In the second, the winners each won again: Hungary prevailed over Poland (10–1) and Italy beat Germany (9–2). Both matches were stopped early as it became clear that Hungary and Italy would both be 2–0 and facing each other in the last set of matches while Germany and Poland would each by 0–2 and facing each other; there would be no tie in the standings to break through bouts lost. The Hungary–Italy match was a de facto gold medal final; Hungary reached 9 wins after 15 bouts to take the victory (9–6). Germany–Poland decided the bronze medal, with Germany taking that honor (9–3).

References

Fencing at the 1936 Summer Olympics
Men's events at the 1936 Summer Olympics